Killinchy is a civil parish in County Down, Northern Ireland. It is mainly situated in the historic barony of Dufferin, with two smaller portions in the baronies of Castlereagh Upper and Castlereagh Lower.

Settlements
Settlements within Killinchy civil parish include:
Balloo
Ballygowan (partly in civil parish of Comber)
Killinchy
Raffrey
Whiterock

Townlands
Killinchy civil parish contains the following townlands:
(Most of the townlands are in the barony of Dufferin, but 5 townlands are in the barony of Castlereagh Lower and 4 in the barony of Castlereagh Upper.)

Aughnadarragh
Balloo
Ballybredagh
Ballycloghan
Ballydorn
Ballygeegan
Ballygowan
Ballymacashen
Ballymacreelly
Ballymorran
Barnamaghery
Bradock Island
Carrickmannan
Carrigullian
Conley Island
Craigarusky
Creevybeg
Darragh Island
Drumreagh
Dunsy Island
Dunsy Rock
Feehary Island
Green Island
Islandbane
Islandmore
Killinakin
Killinchy
Quarterland
Raffrey
Rathgorman
Ravara
Ringhaddy
Shamrock Island
Tullycore
Tullymore

See also
List of civil parishes of County Down

References